The Jackson Guards Memorial is a sculpture commemorating the Jackson Guards, a unit of the Confederate Army, in Arkansas's Jacksonport State Park. The sculpture stands at Washington and Avenue Streets in the park, and depicts a standing male soldier, holding with both hands a rifle, butt on the ground. Funding for the statue was raised by private subscription, and it was unveiled in 1914 in Newport, the county seat of Jackson County. It was moved to its present location in 1965.

In 2017, the memorial was moved 300 feet east in preparation of construction of a new visitors center.

The monument was listed on the National Register of Historic Places in 1996.

See also
National Register of Historic Places listings in Jackson County, Arkansas

References

Monuments and memorials on the National Register of Historic Places in Arkansas
Neoclassical architecture in Arkansas
Buildings and structures completed in 1914
Buildings and structures in Jackson County, Arkansas
National Register of Historic Places in Jackson County, Arkansas
Historic district contributing properties in Arkansas
Confederate States of America monuments and memorials in Arkansas
1914 establishments in Arkansas